Wasserzug is a surname. Notable people with the surname include:

 Étienne Wasserzug (1860–1888), French biologist of Polish origin
  (1894–1992), German theologist
 Haim Wasserzug (1822–1882), cantor and composer
 
 Otto Wasserzug (1889–1944), German actor, also known as Otto Wallburg

German-language surnames